The Harry Gladstein Fieldhouse, also known as the New Fieldhouse, is an indoor track and field complex on the campus of Indiana University in Bloomington, Indiana. From 1960 to 1971 it also served as the home of the Indiana Hoosiers men's basketball team.

History
The Fieldhouse was originally planned to be a state-of-the-art modern basketball arena for the school's basketball team, which had been playing at the Old IU Fieldhouse. However, as the project's commencement dragged on, the allocated money was redirected to a new football stadium. As a result, the plans were revised to be an interim basketball facility that would be handed over to other sports after a suitable permanent basketball arena was constructed. The Fieldhouse cost $1,694,725 to build and was opened in 1960 along with Memorial Stadium as part of the school's new athletic plant. Although it was initially planned to host basketball games for just a few years, Indiana's NCAA probation (due to football violations) set the university back financially. Moreover, after coach Branch McCracken retired, the basketball team fell on hard times. As a result, the basketball team spent eleven years (until 1971) in the Fieldhouse before the construction of Assembly Hall.

The New Fieldhouse was host to the two greatest scoring games in Indiana basketball history when Jimmy Rayl scored 56 points against Minnesota on January 27, 1962, and then scored another 56 against Michigan State on February 23, 1963. The first game was an Indiana win over Indiana State 80-53 on December 3, 1960. The last game was a 103-87 season-ending loss to Illinois on March 13, 1971.

In the summer of 1972, a Tartan track surface was installed at a cost of $280,000. In 1997, the fieldhouse was renamed for Harry Gladstein, a 1931 graduate and former student manager for the track team. His family's $1 million donation allowed for a Mondo Super-X surface to be installed in the fieldhouse. In 2006, a Mondo-surface banked track was installed in the fieldhouse.  This track had previously been installed in the RCA Dome and used for the inaugural 1987 IAAF Indoor World Championships and the NCAA Division I and II indoor track championships held annually through 1999.

The Fieldhouse also played host to the NIKE Indoor High School Track & Field Championship in 2000 and has hosted five (1975, 1982, 1990, 2000, 2007) Big Ten Conference Men's Indoor Track & Field Championships and five (1982, 1986, 1993, 2003, 2009) Big Ten Women's Indoor Track & Field Championships.

Track and field facility records

The track and field records for the facility are as follows:

References

External links
 Harry Gladstein Fieldhouse - IUHoosiers.com

College indoor track and field venues in the United States
Indoor track and field venues in Indiana
Defunct college basketball venues in the United States
Indiana Hoosiers basketball venues
Sports venues in Indiana